Petrašiūnai Cemetery is Lithuania's premiere last resting place formally designated for graves of people influential in national history, politics, arts, and science.

Location 
Its name,  ("of Petrašiūnai"), is based on Petrašiūnai, the borough of the City of Kaunas where it is placed.

History 
The construction of the cemetery began by the end of 1939, burials started in 1941, it was periodically expanded in the late 1950s and needed substantial restoration after the gale of 6 August 2010. The options for a burial at the cemetery have been formally restricted since 1972, the authorities designated it as the location where prominent people of Lithuania are buried, the last resting place of accomplished scientists, writers, artists, and politicians.

Notable graves 

 Vytautas Augustauskas, educator, scientist, sports organizer
 Saliamonas Banaitis, printer, educator, and banker; a signer of the Act of Independence of Lithuania
 Bernardas Brazdžionis, poet 
 Kazys Binkis, poet
 Leonas Bistras, Lithuanian Prime Minister, translator, philosopher, professor 
 Kazimieras Būga, philologist
 Vladimiras Dubeneckis, architect, painter
 Paulius Galaunė, art historian, museum curator, and graphic artist
 Marija Gimbutas, archeologist
 Algirdas Julius Greimas, philosopher, semiotician 
 Juozas Gruodis, composer
 Juozas Grušas, Lithuanian playwright, writer, editor, and dramatist 
 Jonas Jablonskis, philologist
 Kazimieras Jaunius, linguist
 Steponas Kairys, politician, engineer
 Petras Kalpokas, painter
 Petras Klimas, diplomat, historian, a signer of the Act of Independence of Lithuania
 Sofija Kymantaitė-Čiurlionienė, writer, literary critic
 Marija Lastauskienė, writer
 Kazys Lozoraitis, diplomat

 Stasys Lozoraitis, diplomat, Foreign Minister of Lithuania from 1934 until 1938.
 Stasys Lozoraitis Jr. Jr., diplomat
 Algimantas Masiulis, actor
 Antanas Merkys (symbolic tombstone), Prime Minister
 Ričardas Mikutavičius, priest, theologian, poet
 Salomėja Nėris, poet
 Stasys Raštikis, General of the Lithuanian Army
 Petras Rimša, Lithuanian sculptor and medalist
 Česlovas Sasnauskas, composer, organist
 Kazys Šimonis, painter
 Kazys Škirpa, Lithuanian military officer and diplomat
Jonas Semaška, Lithuanian military officer
 Mykolas Sleževičius, Lithuanian Prime Minister, lawyer
 Algirdas Šocikas, Lithuanian boxer
 Aleksandras Štromas, lawyer
 Ričardas Tamulis, boxer
 Romualdas Tumpa, actor
 Juozas Urbšys, diplomat
 Juozas Zikaras, sculptor
 Antanas Žmuidzinavičius, painter

See also 
 List of cemeteries in Lithuania

References

External links

 

Cemeteries in Kaunas
1940 establishments in Lithuania